Juho Heikki Vennola (originally Karhu, 19 June 1872 – 3 December 1938) was Professor of National Economics at the University of Helsinki, a member of the Parliament of Finland, and a politician from the National Progressive Party, who served as Prime Minister of Finland twice.

Vennola's first government was from 15 August 1919 to 15 March 1920 and his second one was from 9 April 1921 to 2 June 1922. He was also acting Prime Minister in the second government of Pehr Evind Svinhufvud from 18 February to 21 March 1931. He also served as Deputy Minister of Finance (1918–1919), Minister of Trade and Industry (1919), Minister of Foreign Affairs (1922–1924) and Minister of Finance (1930–1931).

Vennola, who was born in Oulu, served as a member of the parliament from 1919 to 1930 and was a member of the Tartu Board of Peace in 1920. He died in Helsinki, aged 66.

Cabinets
 Vennola I Cabinet
 Vennola II Cabinet

References

 

 

 
 

 
 

 
 

1872 births
1938 deaths
People from Oulu
People from Oulu Province (Grand Duchy of Finland)
Young Finnish Party politicians
National Progressive Party (Finland) politicians
Prime Ministers of Finland
Ministers of Trade and Industry of Finland
Ministers for Foreign Affairs of Finland
Ministers of Finance of Finland
Members of the Parliament of Finland (1919–22)
Members of the Parliament of Finland (1922–24)
Members of the Parliament of Finland (1924–27)
Members of the Parliament of Finland (1927–29)
Members of the Parliament of Finland (1929–30)
University of Helsinki alumni
Academic staff of the University of Helsinki